The Million Dollar Hotel is a 2000 drama film based on a concept story by Bono and Nicholas Klein, directed by Wim Wenders, and starring Jeremy Davies, Milla Jovovich, and Mel Gibson. The film features music by U2 and various musicians that was released on the soundtrack, The Million Dollar Hotel: Music from the Motion Picture.

Plot
A group of very different people live in a hotel in Los Angeles, California including the romantically involved Tom Tom (Davies) and Eloise (Milla Jovovich). The events that unfold are the result of the death of an important resident, the son (Tim Roth) of a billionaire media mogul. His father commissions an F.B.I. agent (Gibson) to look into his death.

Cast

Production
The story was originally developed by Bono in 1987 when filming the music video for "Where the Streets Have No Name".

Release

Box office
The film had an estimated budget of $8,000,000, but opened to only $29,483 in U.S. box office, with little more success in subsequent weeks or in other countries.

Critical reception
The Million Dollar Hotel received poor reviews, obtaining 25% on Rotten Tomatoes and 25 of 100 on Metacritic, despite winning the Silver Bear at the Berlin International Film Festival in 2000. 

In an October 2000 press conference in Sydney, before the Australian release of the film, Mel Gibson said, "I thought it was as boring as a dog's ass." He later explained:

It was at the end of a day where I had done 6,000 interviews, some guy was ragging on the film and it just slipped out. Later, I thought 'God, why did I say that? I'm an idiot! I produced this film. I'm distributing it!' It was pretty thoughtless of me, because a lot of people worked very hard on that film, and the fact is there are moments of genius in it. The soundtrack is by U2, and it's phenomenal. So I really regret saying that. I have written a lot of apology letters about it.

Soundtrack

References

External links

2000 films
Films directed by Wim Wenders
Films produced by Bruce Davey
Icon Productions films
English-language German films
German drama films
Bono
Films set in Los Angeles
Films set in hotels
2000s English-language films
American drama films
British drama films
2000s American films
2000s British films
2000s German films